Spectar is a mazer shooter released in arcades by Exidy as a sequel to Targ. The game depicts vehicular combat in a future world. The original game was released in November 1980 and a ROM upgrade in April 1981

Gameplay

Spectar is similar to Targ, but with enhancements. It adds blockades to the maze, breaking up the regular grid. The center of the maze has a number of twinkling stars that the player can pick up. In addition to finishing a level by destroying all enemies, the player can also finish the round by picking up all the dots.

The enemies change shape every round (and are worth more points for shooting as the levels increase). Five seconds and ten seconds into each round, a Spectar Smuggler is added, which fires at the player. When the first smuggler appears on the board, the background sound changes, until all smugglers have been destroyed.

The elements that make up the maze change with each level:

Shaded circle
Hollow circle with roughened edges
3D wireframe cubes
Solid crucifix
Solid diamonds
Solid squares crossed with an 'X' shape
3D wireframe pyramids
Hollow octagons
 and subsequent levels: a shape that resembles a space invader with a hollowed out section in the centre that looks like a house

As each level is completed, a bonus of 1000 times the level number is awarded. The bonus does not further increment after level 9.

Legacy
There were a number of bootlegged versions of Spectar released by Exidy rivals which had identical ROMs except for the title screen game names: Panzer and Phantom (released by Proel), Phantomas (Jeutel), and Rallys (Novar).

In 2008, H.R. Kaufmann, president of Exidy, released the original ROM images (ROM revisions 1 and 3) for Spectar into the public domain.

References

External links

1980 video games
Arcade video games
Arcade-only video games
Exidy games
Maze games
Video games developed in the United States
Video game sequels
Video games set in the future